Golden Valley is a census-designated place (CDP) in Washoe County, Nevada, United States. The population was 1,556 at the 2010 census. It is a northern suburb of the city of Reno and is part of the Reno–Sparks Metropolitan Statistical Area. Prior to 2010, it was listed by the U.S. Census Bureau as part of the Lemmon Valley–Golden Valley CDP.

Geography
Lemmon Valley is adjacent to the north.

Demographics

References

Census-designated places in Washoe County, Nevada
Census-designated places in Nevada
Reno, NV Metropolitan Statistical Area